Marsz Generalski (English: The General's March) is a notable Polish patriotic march and the official parade tune of the Polish Armed Forces and the Polish Police. It was composed in 1919 by Henryk Melcer-Szczawiński and was selected in a competition to be the representative military slow march. The General's March is played during the inspection of troops by military commanders, politicians and visiting foreign heads of state.

See also 
 Polish Armed Forces
 Whirlwinds of Danger
 Warszawianka (1831)

Links 
 Audio of the march

References 

Polish military marches
1919 songs